Karasuk (Kara-Suu) is a rural locality (a selo) in Kyzyl-Ozyokskoye Rural Settlement of Mayminsky District, the Altai Republic, Russia. The population was 331 as of 2016. There are 4 streets.

Geography 
Karasuk is located on the Katun River, 33 km southeast of Mayma (the district's administrative centre) by road. Kyzyl-Ozyok is the nearest rural locality.

References 

Rural localities in Mayminsky District